Ythanbank is a village in Aberdeenshire, Scotland.

References

Villages in Aberdeenshire